Zafri Khan (ﻇﻔﺮﯼ ﺧﺎﻥ; born November 25, ?) is a Pakistani actor and comedian. Born in Punjab (Faisalabad). He is best known for his work in Pakistan theatre, based in Lahore. He also has a successful career in television and films. Khan is famous for his Slapstick comedy. He has acted with a number of other comedians including Nasir Chinyoti, Murtaza Hassan, Naseem Vicky, Amanullah, Babu Baral, Sohail Ahmad, Iftikhar Thakur, Anwar Ali, Tariq Teddy and Sakhawat Naz.

Early life
Zafri Khan was born in Punjab on November 25.

Career

Early work
Zafri Khan started his career from Pakistan Theatre. His acclaimed theatre career has continued to flourish and he is now regarded as one of the most popular stage actors.

2010s: Established star
In 2016, Khan participated in Indian comedy competition show called Mazaak Mazaak Mein. He hosted a talk show called Afra Zafri on 24 News HD in 2018. Khan portrayed the role of Advocate Bilal in Punjabi movie Chal Mera Putt 2 His performance in the film was well received by critics.

2020s: Khabardaar
Khan joined Comedy satire Show, Khabardaar on Express News in 2021 after Honey Albela left the show.

Filmography

Film

Reality shows

Theatre 
 Unknown year : Mithiyan Shrartan
 Unknown year : Dhumka

References

External links
 

Living people
Punjabi people
Male actors from Lahore
Pakistani male television actors
Pakistani male stage actors
Pakistani stand-up comedians
Pakistani theatre directors
Year of birth missing (living people)